The 2013 Ligas Superiores, the fifth division of Peruvian football (soccer), was played on a home-and-away round-robin basis.

Liga Superior del Callao

Liga Superior de Lambayeque

Liguilla

Liga Superior de Piura

Liga Superior de Tumbes

External links
 DeChalaca.com - copaperu.pe la información más completa del "fútbol macho" en todo el Perú

2013
5